Goutam Paul is an Indian politician who is serving as Member of 17th West Bengal Assembly from Karandighi Assembly constituency. He is from All India Trinamool Congress. He won with 116,594 votes.

References 

Trinamool Congress politicians
West Bengal MLAs 2021–2026
Year of birth missing (living people)
Living people